Cecilio Perez Bordon served as the Paraguayan Minister of Public Works under President Fernando Lugo since August 2010 until 2012. Prior to this, he served as Minister of Defense.

Awards

References

Living people
Government ministers of Paraguay
Year of birth missing (living people)
Recipients of the Order of Military Merit (Brazil)